Marco D'Argenio (born 30 June 1984 in Avellino) is an Italian football player, who currently plays for FC Maritsa Plovdiv, in the Bulgarian 3rd division.

Career
After spending the first seven years of his career in his home country with Fano Calcio, Jesina, F.C. Pro Vasto and A.C.D. Torgiano, D'Argenio relocated to Bulgaria in September 2009. He signed a two-year contract with Botev Plovdiv on 7 September. D'Argenio made his competitive debut for Botev on 20 September 2009 against Litex Lovech in the sixth round of the A PFG.

References

External links
 Player Profile at calciatori.com

1984 births
Living people
Italian footballers
Association football defenders
Vastese Calcio 1902 players
Botev Plovdiv players
Italian expatriates in Bulgaria
First Professional Football League (Bulgaria) players
Expatriate footballers in Bulgaria
Association football midfielders